Kerry Davis (born 2 August 1962) is an English former international women's footballer. During her 16-year international career, Davis represented the England women's national football team in the inaugural 1984 UEFA Championships final and at England's first FIFA Women's World Cup appearance in 1995. She also helped England win the Mundialito tournament in Italy and scored for her country at Wembley Stadium. At club level Davis spent four seasons playing in Italy, in between spells with Crewe Alexandra Ladies. She later played for Liverpool Ladies and Croydon.

Club career
Davis was a 23–year–old student from Stoke-on-Trent, playing for Crewe Alexandra Ladies, when Italian club Roi Lazio signed her in November 1985. She spent four years playing semi–professionally in Italy, one year at the Stadio Flaminio with Roi Lazio, two years with Trani and one with Napoli. In her second season with Trani, Davis played alongside compatriot Debbie Bampton. They finished runners–up in both the Serie A and national Cup before the club folded and Bampton returned to England.

After a further year at Napoli, Davis returned to Crewe Alexandra Ladies, but by April 1994 was playing for Knowsley United Women in the FA Women's Cup final. Knowsley became Liverpool Ladies that summer and Davis left for Croydon Women in December 1994.
 
In 1996, Davis was playing for Croydon when they won the league and cup double. In May 1996 goals from Davis and Brenda Sempare earned the decisive 2–1 league win over Arsenal Ladies. That summer she sparked rumours of a transfer by guesting for Arsenal Ladies in a pre–season tournament, but remained with Croydon. She eventually resigned in April 1999.

International career
David made her England debut in 1982, becoming England's first black woman international. Davis played in the first UEFA championships for national women's teams in 1984. England reached the final only to lose to Sweden on penalties, despite Davis successfully converting her kick. In the qualifying stages, Davis had been England's top scorer after making her debut in the first ever match in UEFA competition; a 7–1 win over Northern Ireland at Gresty Road on 19 September 1982. In August 1985 Davis scored in a 1–1 group stage draw with Italy, during England's victorious Mundialito campaign. At the 1987 UEFA championships England lost to Sweden at the semi–final stage, 3–2 after extra time. Davis gave England the lead against Italy in the third place match, but Carolina Morace and Betty Vignotto replied to ensure England finished fourth.

As a curtain–raiser to the 1990 FA Charity Shield, England played Italy at Wembley Stadium. Davis netted a consolation in England's 4–1 defeat, while Carolina Morace scored all four Italian goals and featured on the front page of the following day's La Gazzetta dello Sport. Davis later described her former Trani teammate Morace as: "the best women's player I have ever seen."

Davis also played in all four of England's matches at the 1995 FIFA Women's World Cup. She had won her 60th cap in the 4–1 UEFA Women's Euro 1995 semi–final first–leg defeat to Germany on 11 December 1994. In May 1996 Davis scored two goals and set up the other for strike–partner Kelly Smith in a 3–0 win over Portugal at Griffin Park. Although Davis's versatility saw her selected as a midfielder or sometimes as a defender, she continued to score at a prolific rate. By the time of a World Cup qualifier against the Netherlands in October 1997, Davis had 42 goals in 78 appearances. In March 1998, Davis made her 82nd and final appearance for England, but was substituted 20 minutes into a 1–0 defeat to Germany at The Den.

Davis left the England squad in April 1998, ahead of another friendly with Italy.

In October 2010, She Kicks magazine reported that Davis remained England's all–time record goalscorer. Although it was stated that records were "sketchy" because the Football Association (FA) took over running women's football in 1993. There was uncertainty whether all Davis's goals before this were scored in matches considered official. In February 2012 Kelly Smith netted twice against Finland, moving on to 45 goals for England and setting a new record.

Personal life
Davis was born in England to a Jamaican father and English mother. After returning from Italy Davis worked in a sports shop in Stoke-on-Trent.

References

1962 births
Living people
Footballers from Stoke-on-Trent
English women's footballers
England women's international footballers
English sportspeople of Jamaican descent
FA Women's National League players
Charlton Athletic W.F.C. players
Expatriate footballers in Italy
Liverpool F.C. Women players
1995 FIFA Women's World Cup players
English expatriate women's footballers
Serie A (women's football) players
S.S. Lazio Women 2015 players
A.C.F. Trani 80 players
Women's association football forwards